Brands are ordered alphabetically.

References

Tablet PC Brands
Convertible tablet computer brands